

Champions
Chronicle-Telegraph Cup: Brooklyn Superbas over Pittsburgh Pirates (3–1)
National League: Brooklyn Superbas

Statistical leaders

National League final standings

Events
January 19 - Boston Beaneaters catcher Marty Bergen, reportedly depressed by his son's death in 1898, allegedly kills his family with an ax and then commits suicide in Brookfield, Massachusetts.
February 17 - Due to unpaid alimony, Mary H. Vanderbeck takes possession of the American League franchise in Detroit. Her ex-husband, George Vanderbeck, will later regain control of the team.
March 8 - The National League decides to downsize to eight teams for the upcoming season by eliminating the circuit's franchises in Baltimore, Cleveland, Louisville, and Washington.
March 9 - Infielders John O'Brien, Art Madison, George Fox, and pitcher Jack Chesbro are transferred from the defunct Louisville Colonels franchise to the Pittsburgh Pirates. 
April 19 – In Boston, the Phillies win 19–17 in the NL's highest scoring opening day game. Boston tied the game with 9 runs in the ninth. Philadelphia, once up 16–4, scores 2 in the 10th for the win.
May 5 – The Orphans' Jimmy Ryan hits his 20th career leadoff homer against the visiting Cincinnati Reds and Noodles Hahn. Chicago wins 4–3.
June 5 - Pirates' first baseman Duff Cooley has only two putouts in a 6-5 loss to the Phillies 
June 19 - Clark Griffith and Rube Waddell have a duel for the ages. Each throw 13 shut out innings before Griffith hits a walk off double in the 14th.
June 21 - Citing the Superbas' poor attendance at Brooklyn's Washington Park, National League president Ned Young discusses the possibility of moving the franchise to Washington, D.C. The reigning NL champions, en route to their second consecutive title, are averaging only a thousand fans on non-holiday dates.
June 22 - Umpire Hank O'Day forfeits the game to the Brooklyn Superbas when the Philadelphia Phillies stall in the bottom of the 11th inning, hoping the delay postpones the game due to darkness. Brooklyn had scored seven runs in the top of the frame to pull ahead 20-13.
July 4 – At the West Side Grounds, about 1,000 of the 10,000 fans at the game fire pistols to celebrate July 4. No injuries were reported.  Meanwhile, Chicago beats Philadelphia, 5–4, in 12 innings.
July 7 – Kid Nichols of the Boston Beaneaters records his 300th career win.
July 12 – Noodles Hahn pitches a no-hitter for the Cincinnati Reds against the Philadelphia Phillies.  The Reds win, 4–0.
July 13 – The Phillies' third baseman, Harry Wolverton, has 3 triples among his 5 hits in a 23–8 win over the Pirates.
July 17 – The Giants' Christy Mathewson, acquired from Norfolk of the North Carolina League, makes his major league debut, relieving in the 5th inning against Brooklyn at Washington Park with the score tied, 5–5. The results are less than glowing: 2 walks, 3 hit batters, 5 runs. Ed Doheny relieves Mathewson after 4; the Superbas win the game, 13–7.
July 26 - In Brooklyn, a sheriff seizes the St. Louis Cardinals share of the gate receipts in order to pay former Cardinals pitcher Gus Weyhing, who'd claimed the Cardinals had not paid him for his services before releasing him. Weyhing would later sign with Brooklyn as a free agent. 
August 17 - Reds pitcher Bill Phillips punches Phillies hitter Roy Thomas after Thomas fouled off 12 straight pitches. Phillips is ejected, but the Reds win in extra innings.
August 19 - After being promised by manager Connie Mack that he could take the next few days off, Rube Waddell pitches both games in a double header for Milwaukee of the Western League. In game one, Waddell threw for 17 innings, and followed that up by taking a one hitter into the fifth inning of the second game, in total, Waddell pitched 22 innings worth of baseball in one day. 
August 22 - The Chicago Orphans acquire catcher Roger Bresnahan, only to release him after he appeared in two games. Bresnahan would go on to have a hall of fame career catching for the New York Giants.
September 11 Catcher Johnny Kling makes his MLB debut for the Chicago Orphans. Kling doesn't get a hit in his debut, but he'd go on to be the Orphans (later re-named the Cubs) starting catcher for the next several seasons.
September 17 - Tommy Corcoran leaves his shortstop position and begins digging around the third base coaching box with his spikes. The Reds' captain uncovers a metal box with an electrical device inside with attached wires which is most likely being used by the Phillies in a sophisticated scheme to steal signs. 
December 15 - The Cincinnati Reds trade pitcher Christy Mathewson to the New York Giants for pitcher Amos Rusie, who hadn't pitched in a game since 1898. This trade becomes one of the first ever "flops": Mathewson goes on to a Hall of Fame career with the Giants, while Rusie doesn't even last a full season in Cincinnati.

Births

January
January 1 – Teddy Kearns
January 1 – Al Stokes
January 6 – Clyde Beck
January 7 – John Beckwith
January 7 – Johnny Grabowski
January 7 – Carlton Lord
January 9 – Frank Barnes
January 11 – Lefty Taber
January 16 – Joe Rabbitt
January 21 – Willie Ludolph
January 26 – Lefty Jamerson
January 28 – Emil Yde
January 31 – Honey Barnes

February
February 2 – Willie Kamm
February 2 – Frank Mack
February 7 – Bill Riggins
February 9 – Tom Gee
February 15 – George Earnshaw
February 19 – John Kane
February 19 – Oscar Roettger
February 20 – Al Williamson
February 22 – Roy Spencer
February 25 – Joe Burns
February 25 – John Gillespie
February 28 – Doc Wood

March
March 6 – Lefty Grove
March 9 – Bill Narleski
March 11 – Rusty Pence
March 14 – Marty McManus
March 22 – Dip Orange
March 25 – Russ Miller
March 29 – Red Schillings
March 31 – Mule Suttles

April
April 4 – Jule Mallonee
April 6 – Joe Wyatt
April 11 – John Middleton
April 12 – Mickey O'Neil
April 13 – Rufe Clarke
April 16 – Walt Schulz
April 22 – Paul Florence
April 23 – Jim Bottomley
April 23 – Joe Kelly
April 25 – Jake Freeze
April 26 – Hack Wilson

May
May 12 – Phil Voyles
May 20 – Claral Gillenwater
May 20 – George Grantham
May 20 – Ollie Klee
May 21 – Sam Langford
May 22 – Hooks Cotter
May 23 – Duke Brett
May 24 – Wally Shaner
May 24 – Al Shealy
May 24 – Clay Van Alstyne
May 28 – Bill Barrett
May 30 – Jute Bell

June
June 1 – Dutch Schesler
June 3 – Harry Baldwin
June 4 – George Watkins
June 5 – John Cavanaugh
June 7 – Ed Wells
June 9 – Marty Callaghan
June 10 – Garland Braxton
June 10 – Lefty Wolf
June 12 – Charlie Barnabe
June 13 – Chief Youngblood
June 21 – Red Barron
June 22 – Joe Poetz
June 23 – Bill Harris
June 26 – Lum Davenport
June 26 – Elmer Yoter

July
July 1 – Louis Brower
July 1 – Mel Simons
July 2 – Joe Bennett
July 2 – Ernie Vick
July 3 – Joe Brown
July 4 – Dot Fulghum
July 4 – Wes Kingdon
July 12 – Rudy Miller
July 13 – Footsie Blair
July 14 – Dave Harris
July 20 – Hunter Lane
July 23 – Jimmie Wilson
July 24 – Jim Lyle
July 30 – Paul Fitzke
July 31 – Heinie Scheer

August
August 12 – Spence Harris
August 16 – Billy Rhiel
August 17 – Elmer Pence

September
September 1 – Hub Pruett
September 2 – Joe Heving
September 5 – Ike Kamp
September 5 – Merv Shea
September 15 – Bud Clancy
September 15 – Roy Meeker
September 17 – Hughie Critz
September 17 – Roy Luebbe
September 17 – Sam Streeter
September 19 – Jim Wright
September 21 – John Bogart
September 22 – Bud Heine
September 23 – Lefty Stewart

October
October 3 – Red Dorman
October 9 – Freddy Spurgeon
October 13 – Heinie Odom
October 16 – Nick Cullop
October 16 – Goose Goslin
October 17 – Ernie Wingard
October 19 – Herb Welch
October 20 – Jimmy Uchrinscko
October 22 – Bill Bishop
October 22 – Jumbo Elliott
October 24 – Ossie Bluege
October 27 – Red Proctor
October 28 – Johnny Neun
October 31 – Cal Hubbard

November
November 5 – Pete Donohue
November 11 – Boob Fowler
November 12 – Herm Merritt
November 17 – Ossie Orwoll
November 18 – Jim Marquis
November 18 – Vince Shields
November 26 – John Churry

December
December 1 – Eppie Barnes
December 1 – Mike Cvengros
December 8 – Mose Solomon
December 10 – Roy Carlyle
December 14 – Harry Wilke
December 16 – Tony Kaufmann
December 17 – Karl Swanson
December 19 – Wally Gilbert
December 19 – Tex Jeanes
December 20 – Gabby Hartnett
December 21 – Doc Hamann
December 23 – Danny Taylor
December 28 – Ted Lyons
December 31 – Syl Johnson

Deaths
January 9 – Henry Kessler, 53, shortstop who hit .253 for the Brooklyn Atlantics and Cincinnati Reds from 1873 to 1877.
January 19 – Marty Bergen, 28, catcher for the Boston Beaneaters since 1896 who batted .280 for the 1898 championship team
January 21 – Jim Rogers, 27, played two seasons and managed one from 1896 to 1897.
February 7 – "Brewery Jack" Taylor, 26, pitcher for the Cincinnati Reds (among others), who had three 20-win seasons from 1894–'96, and led the National League in games and innings in the 1898 season.
February 23 – Nate Berkenstock, 69[?], played right field for one game with the 1871 Philadelphia Athletics.
March 31 – Foghorn Bradley, 44, pitcher for the 1876 Boston Red Caps who went on to umpire for six major league seasons.
April 28 – Walter Plock, 30, center fielder for the 1891 Philadelphia Phillies.
May 14 – Billy Taylor, 45[?], player for seven seasons, mostly as a pitcher and outfielder, from 1881 to 1887.
May 15 – John Traffley, 38[?], right fielder who appeared in two games with the 1889 Louisville Colonels.
May 31 – Tom Patterson, 55[?], outfielder for four seasons in the National Association.
June 1 – Charlie Gray, 36[?], pitcher who went 1–4 for the 1890 Pittsburgh Alleghenys.
June 12 – Mox McQuery, 38, first baseman who hit .271 with 13 home runs and 160 RBI in 417 games, and the National League in putouts in 1886.
June 13 – Frank Fleet, 52[?], utility player for five seasons in the National Association.
July 15 – Billy Barnie, 47, manager of the Orioles from 1883 to 1891, and later of three other teams; pilot of Hartford team in Eastern League since 1899.
July 22 – Harry Jacoby, [?], infielder/outfielder for two seasons with the Baltimore Orioles of the American Association.
July 24 – Fred Zahner, 30, backup catcher who hit .214 with the Louisville Colonels from 1894–'95.
August 24 – John Puhl, 24, third baseman who played briefly for the New York Giants in 1898 and 1899.
September 14 – Ed Knouff, 33, pitcher/outfielder who posted a 20–20 record and hit a .187 average in the American Association from 1885 to 1889.
October 7 – Bill Phillips, 43, first baseman for Cleveland and Brooklyn who was the first Canadian in the major leagues; batted. 302 in 1885.
October 9 – Harry Wheeler, 42, pitcher and outfielder for eight different teams between 1878 and 1884.
December 14 – Jim Devlin, 34, pitcher who posted an 11–10 record with a 3.38 ERA for the New York Giants, Philadelphia Quakers and St. Louis Browns from 1886 to 1889.

External links
1900 in baseball history from ThisGreatGame.com